William Taillefer may refer to:
William Taillefer I (died 962), first to be called William Taillefer
William II of Angoulême (died 1028), William Taillefer II
William V of Angoulême (died 1120), William Taillefer III
William VI of Angoulême (died 1179), William Taillefer IV
William VII of Angoulême (died 1186), William Taillefer V
William III, Count of Toulouse (975–1037)

See also 
Taillefer (disambiguation)